A by-election was held for the New South Wales Legislative Assembly electorate of Sturt on 21 February 1981 following the resignation of Tim Fischer to successfully contest the seat of Murray at the 1980 by-election.

By-elections for the seats of Cessnock, Oxley and Maitland were held on the same day.

Dates

Results

Tim Fischer resigned to successfully contest the 1980 Murray by-election.

See also
Electoral results for the district of Sturt
List of New South Wales state by-elections

References

1981 elections in Australia
New South Wales state by-elections
1980s in New South Wales